Revier is a German word meaning  area or territory. 

It may also refer to:

 "Revier", a common nickname for the Ruhr region
 Revierderby, a football rivalry between Ruhr teams
 Revierlöwen Oberhausen, a former ice hockey team in Oberhausen, Germany
 Musiktheater im Revier, a performing arts venue in Gelsenkirchen, Germany
 Revier (Nazi concentration camps), the alleged medical facility for inmates in the camps
 Wolffs Revier, a German television series

People
 Abraham de Revier Sr., the first elder of the Old Dutch Church of Sleepy Hollow in Sleepy Hollow, New York
 Harry Revier (1890 – 1957), an independent American filmmaker
 Dorothy Revier (1904 – 1993), an American actress

See also
Reviers, a commune in France
 in Wiktionary